is a Japanese football player who plays for Thespakusatsu Gunma.

Club statistics
Updated to 23 February 2020.

References

External links

Profile at Thespakusatsu Gunma 

1982 births
Living people
Biwako Seikei Sport College alumni
Association football people from Osaka Prefecture
Japanese footballers
J1 League players
J2 League players
J3 League players
Kataller Toyama players
Cerezo Osaka players
Montedio Yamagata players
Thespakusatsu Gunma players
Association football defenders